South Ubian, officially the Municipality of South Ubian,  is a 3rd class municipality in the province of Tawi-Tawi, Philippines. According to the 2020 census, it has a population of 29,583 people.

Geography

Barangays
South Ubian is politically subdivided into 31 barangays.

Climate

Demographics

Economy

References

External links
 South Ubian Profile at PhilAtlas.com
 [ Philippine Standard Geographic Code]
 South Ubian Profile at the DTI Cities and Municipalities Competitive Index
 Philippine Census Information

Municipalities of Tawi-Tawi
Island municipalities in the Philippines